Issam El Adoua (born 9 December 1986) is a Moroccan footballer who plays as a Al Arabi as a central defender.

Club career
Born in Casablanca, El Adoua made his senior debuts for his hometown's Wydad Casablanca and formed a solid partnership with Hicham Louissi during his spell at the club.

On 25 May 2009 El Adoua moved abroad, signing a four-year deal with Ligue 1 side RC Lens. He made his debut for the side on 23 September, starting in a 4–3 away win over Montpellier HSC, for the campaign's Coupe de la Ligue; however, he failed to appear in the league, and was subsequently loaned to FC Nantes on 16 January of the following year. He appeared eight times in Ligue 2 before returning to his parent club.

In June 2010 El Adoua moved to Kuwait, joining Al Qadsia SC. In his one-year spell he won the Premier League and the Federation Cup. On 4 June 2011 he moved teams and countries again, signing a two-year deal with Primeira Liga side Vitória S.C.

On 18 June 2013 the free agent El Adoua joined Levante UD, signing a two-year deal. He made his La Liga debut on 17 August, coming on as a second-half substitute in a 0–7 away loss at FC Barcelona.

On 15 February 2015, El Adoua transferred to Chinese Super League side Chongqing Lifan.

International career
After appearing for the Morocco under-23's, El Adoua made a full international debut for Morocco on August 12, 2009 in a friendly against Congo.

Position
Usually a central defender, El Adoua can also play as a defensive midfielder.

Honours
Wydad Casablanca
GNF 1: 2005–06

Al Qadsia
Kuwaiti Premier League: 2010–11
Kuwait Federation Cup: 2010–11

Vitória Guimarães
Portuguese Cup: 2012–13

References

External links
 
 
 

1986 births
Living people
Moroccan footballers
Footballers from Casablanca
Wydad AC players
RC Lens players
FC Nantes players
Qadsia SC players
Vitória S.C. players
Levante UD footballers
Chongqing Liangjiang Athletic F.C. players
Al Dhafra FC players
C.D. Aves players
Kuwait SC players
Al-Arabi SC (UAE) players
Botola players
Ligue 1 players
Ligue 2 players
Kuwait Premier League players
Primeira Liga players
La Liga players
Chinese Super League players
UAE Pro League players
UAE First Division League players
2013 Africa Cup of Nations players
Morocco international footballers
Moroccan expatriate footballers
Expatriate footballers in France
Expatriate footballers in Kuwait
Expatriate footballers in Portugal
Expatriate footballers in Spain
Expatriate footballers in China
Expatriate footballers in the United Arab Emirates
Moroccan expatriate sportspeople in France
Moroccan expatriate sportspeople in Kuwait
Moroccan expatriate sportspeople in Portugal
Moroccan expatriate sportspeople in Spain
Moroccan expatriate sportspeople in China
Moroccan expatriate sportspeople in the United Arab Emirates
Association football central defenders